Buruq (also, Burğu, Burug, and Burukh) is a village and municipality in the Lerik Rayon of Azerbaijan.  It has a population of 370.

References 

Populated places in Lerik District